The Pittsburgh Vintage Grand Prix is a vintage motor sports car race and 10-day Motorsport Festival that takes place annually in mid-July in Schenley Park located in Pittsburgh, Pennsylvania, United States. With an estimated 200,000 spectators during the 10 days, the Pittsburgh Vintage Grand Prix is one of the largest vintage sports car race events in the United States and the only one run entirely on city streets. The race originated in 1983 and grows each year with an ever-widening national and international recognition as one of the premier vintage motorsports events. The race is the highlight of a 10-day Race Week. The opening weekend at Pittsburgh International Race Complex hosts the PVGP Historics for faster cars.

The event at Schenley Park hosts 150 vintage racers, 3,000 show cars and 100,000 weekend spectators. The street course, considered the most challenging on the vintage race circuit traverses Schenley Park's Serpentine Drive and consists of a 2.33-mile circuit that has 23 turns, haybales, manhole covers, telephone poles, and stone walls. 2022 will mark the 41st year with the signature event, the International Car Show and Vintage Races, through the streets of Schenley Park on the July 22/23, 2023 weekend. Since 1983 the event has donated more than $6 million to autistic and developmentally disabled individuals throughout the Pittsburgh region.

The Grand Prix has developed into a 10-day celebration of motorsports and in addition to two weekends of racing it now includes a Black-Tie Gala, a Tune-Up Party, a Road Rallye, a downtown car display, an Airport Hangar Party, Countryside Tour and three car shows.

References

External links

 Pittsburgh Vintage Grand Prix

Sports in Pittsburgh
Auto races in the United States
Recurring sporting events established in 1983
Historic motorsport events
Motorsport in Pennsylvania